Ipomoea reptans can refer to:

Ipomoea reptans Anon., a synonym of Ipomoea aquatica Forssk. var. aquatica
Ipomoea reptans (L.) Poir. ex G.Don., a synonym of Merremia hirta (L.) Merr. var. hirta